Einstein and Einstein is a 2013 Chinese film directed by Cao Baoping.

It was first played in October 2013 at the Youth Generation International Film Forum, and it was first played in theaters in China in 2018.

Elizabeth Kerr of The Hollywood Reporter wrote that the film has "a happy ending that suggests the modernization of China is an iterative process that will trickle down to the Li Wans of the world — eventually."

References

External links
 
 Einstein and Einstein at Douban 

2013 films
Chinese drama films